This is a list of protected areas of Saskatchewan.

National parks

Provincial parks 
The federal government transferred control of natural resources to the western provinces in 1930 with the Natural Resources Acts. At that time, the Saskatchewan government set up its own Department of Natural Resources. In an attempt to get people working and to encourage tourism during the Great Depression, several projects were set up by the government, including setting up a provincial park system in 1931. The founding parks include Cypress Hills, Duck Mountain, Good Spirit Lake, Moose Mountain, Katepwa Point, and Little Manitou. Greenwater Lake was added in 1932. Two more parks were added by the end of the 1930s and Little Manitou ceased to be a provincial park in 1956 and in 1962, it became a regional park.

The list of parks, and their types, come from The Parks Act.

Regional parks 
Most Regional Parks are established as per the Regional Parks Act. Virtually all of the regional parks in Saskatchewan are affiliated with the Saskatchewan Regional Parks Association (SRPA). The SPRA supports the parks by assisting with research, education, marketing, etc.

A yearly park pass purchased at any SRPA park also grants access to all other SRPA parks.

The Meewasin Valley Authority Act, the Wakamow Valley Authority Act, and the Provincial Capital Commission Act also give authority to create regional parks.

The following is a list of all the regional parks:

Provincial recreation sites 
The following is a list of Saskatchewan provincial recreation sites:

Wildlife refuges 
The following is a list of Saskatchewan wildlife refuges:

Provincial forests 

 Canwood Provincial Forest
 Fort à la Corne Provincial Forest
 Nisbet Provincial Forest
 Northern Provincial Forest
 Porcupine Provincial Forest
 Torch River Provincial Forest

Other sites with provincial protection 
The list of protected areas below comes from the Parks Act.

 Anderson Island
 Bakken – Wright Bison Drive
 Besant Midden
 Brockelbank Hill
 Christopher Lake
 Fort Black
 Glen Ewen Burial Mound
 Grasslands Protected Area
 Gray Archaeological Site
 Great Sandhills Ecological Reserve
 Gull Lake
 Harder Archaeological Site
 Hickson – Maribelli Lakes Pictographs
 Lemsford Ferry Tipi Rings
 Macdowall Bog
 Massold Clay Canyons
 Matador Grasslands
 Maurice Street Wildlife Sanctuary
 Minton Turtle Effigy
 Nipekamew Sand Cliffs
 Ogema Boulder Effigy
 Pine Island Trading Post
 Thomas Battersby
 Valeport Wildlife Management Area
 Walter Felt Bison Drive
 Waskwei River

National Wildlife Areas

Migratory Bird Sanctuaries

Nature Conservancy Canada properties

National Historic Sites 

There are 49 National Historic Sites designated in Saskatchewan, 10 of which are administered by Parks Canada.

See also 
List of nature centres in Saskatchewan
List of Canadian protected areas
List of National Parks of Canada

References

External links

Migratory Bird Sanctuaries 
National Wildlife Areas

Saskatchewan
Environment of Saskatchewan
Protected areas